Daniel Habesohn (born 22 July 1986 in Vienna) is an Austrian table tennis player. He competed at the 2016 Summer Olympics as part of the Austrian team in the men's team event. Habesohn competed in the 2017 World Table Tennis Championships, upsetting Japanese player and number 15 seed Kenta Matsudaira (7-11, 11-13, 11-6, 12-10, 13-11, 7-11, and 11-8). He then went on to lose to Chinese player and number 33 seed Lin Gaoyuan (1-11, 2-11, 6-11, 11-8, and 4-11). He teamed with Robert Gardos in the Men's Doubles Event, dropping out in the first round in a close match with the Belarusian Duo of Vladimir Samsonov and Pavel Platonov (7-11, 11-9, 11-7, 9-11, 8-11, 11-9, and 9-11).

In 2021, he competed in the 2020 Olympics.

References

1986 births
Living people
Austrian male table tennis players
Olympic table tennis players of Austria
Table tennis players at the 2016 Summer Olympics
Table tennis players at the 2020 Summer Olympics
Table tennis players at the 2015 European Games
European Games medalists in table tennis
European Games bronze medalists for Austria
Table tennis players at the 2019 European Games
Sportspeople from Vienna